Hornsey and Wood Green is a constituency in Greater London created in 1983 and represented in the House of Commons of the UK Parliament since 2015 by Catherine West, of the Labour Party.  To date it has drawn together for general elections parts of the London Borough of Haringey (created in 1965).

Boundaries 
1983–2010: The London Borough of Haringey wards of Alexandra, Archway, Bowes Park, Crouch End, Fortis Green, Highgate, Hornsey Central, Hornsey Vale, Muswell Hill, Noel Park, South Hornsey, Woodside.

2010–present: The London Borough of Haringey wards of Alexandra, Bounds Green, Crouch End, Fortis Green, Highgate, Hornsey, Muswell Hill, Noel Park, Stroud Green, Woodside.

Constituency profile 
The constituency takes in the western part of the London Borough of Haringey, stretching from Highgate in the south west of the seat, through Muswell Hill, Crouch End and Wood Green in the north east corner of the seat.

More out-of-work benefits reliance (8.9%) exists in the seat than the London average (8.4%, which is compares to 6.4% nationally in April 2021) and among those aged 18 to 24 the percentage is 12.7% in the seat during the COVID-19 pandemic recovery. Women, living in the constituency, working full time at this time earned £102 per week more than men, earning 98% of the London average pay; whereas for men the figure was 79% of London's average pay and which was £50 below the national average.

Political history
The seat created in 1983 has had representation by the three largest English political parties at Westminster.

The win from the incumbent Liberal Democrat in 2015 by Labour Party's candidate was a strong swing and made the seat the 137th safest of Labour's 232 seats by percentage of majority.

2016 EU Referendum
In the 2016 United Kingdom European Union membership referendum, the constituency is estimated to have voted between 66% and 82% to Remain in the EU.

History 
The constituency was created in 1983 from the safe Conservative seat of Hornsey and the more Labour-inclined Wood Green. In those boundary changes the Wood Green seat was broadly divided into two, with half being merged with Hornsey and the rest being transferred to the neighbouring constituency of Tottenham, to the east — a very small part of the Hornsey seat was also transferred to Tottenham at the same time.

This was a Conservative Party seat until 1992 but by 1997 swung so heavily it suggested a Labour Party safe seat — Barbara Roche enjoyed a majority of over 20,000. The Liberal Democrats, however, supplanted those parties in the area, both at Parliamentary level where they won the seat in 2005 and held it until 2015; and in local terms. At the 2015 election this seat had the lowest combined Conservative and UKIP percentage in England (11.45%).

The seat had a large swing to Labour of over 15% in the 2017 general election, similar to that of two years earlier, meaning it now has a history of political volatility; in five out of the last seven general elections, there have been swings to Labour or the Liberal Democrats of between 13 and 16%.

Members of Parliament

Election results

Elections in the 2010s

Elections in the 2000s

Elections in the 1990s

Elections in the 1980s

See also 
 List of parliamentary constituencies in London
 Opinion polling for the next United Kingdom general election in individual constituencies

Notes

References

External links 
Politics Resources (Election results from 1922 onwards)
Electoral Calculus (Election results from 1955 onwards)

Parliamentary constituencies in London
Constituencies of the Parliament of the United Kingdom established in 1983
Politics of the London Borough of Haringey
Hornsey
Wood Green